Laurentian High School was a former Ottawa high school. It was located on Baseline Rd. at the corner of Clyde, in the city's West End. The school opened in 1958. LHS provided education to grade 9 through 12 through an unsemestered curriculum as established by the Ontario Ministry of Education 1958–2005. LHS provided grade 13 from 1961 to 2003.

The property is located at one edge of River Ward, with College Ward and Knoxdale-Merivale Ward adjacent.

Architecture
The project generated some controversy as the Collegiate Board presented a plan that included an auditorium, double gym, and a cafeteria. The Ottawa Property Owners association objected to these as expensive and unneeded luxuries, and the mayor Charlotte Whitton agreed. The dispute delayed the construction of the school for some time.

It was built at the same time as Rideau High School and Ridgemont High School and has the same base design by architects Hazelgrove, Lithwick and Lambert with well-lit efficient circulation, and a large auditorium. The double gymnasium block projected into a large sports field and oval track that was known as the R.D. Campbell Stadium. In the evenings, 800 adults used the facilities including the commercial, science, home economics, science rooms and gymnasia. For adults, commercial and business classes were offered in addition to hunter safety and Scottish Country Dancing. There were tennis courts, a large parking lot, well equipped science labs, technical shops and a library. There were two storey t-shaped wings for classrooms, with the gym, auditorium and cafeteria in bumped out blocks. The building was constructed of orange-buff brick with contrasting brick in perpendicular bars on the fly over the auditorium stage. At Laurentian the auditorium stage fly was decorated at the corners with white bricks in a ladder motif. There were horizontal bands of windows in silver aluminum, which were later retrofitted with tinted glass in brown anodized frames. An entrance forecourt was reached by a circular drive. The main door was through a vestibule set at an angle between a classroom wing and the cafeteria block. The school's most architecturally interesting feature was a smokestack with a heavy fire door at the base for cleaning out the ash and soot.

History

1950s – increasing enrollment
The sod was turned by Claude Biseau, former President of Carleton University on September 11, 1956. The Mayor of Ottawa from 1957 to 1960, George H. Nelms, placed the granite cornerstone on June 24, 1957. When the school opened in September 1958, 600 students enrolled, which was twice the number that had been expected. Mr. W.B. Wallen was LHS' first principal. The LHS students reduced overcrowding at Nepean High School (Ottawa) and Fisher Park High School. Fisher High's enrolment dropped from 1,900 to 1,439 students.

The LHS motto, by wisdom and by courage was chosen. The LHS yearbook, initially known as Laurentian Review was renamed the Laureate.

Construction continued for the entire first year of the school. Over time, Laurentian expanded twice, bringing its capacity to 1,143 students. By 1957, a new wing added 23 classes and an auditorium seating 750. The R. D. Campbell stadium, was named after the former Director of Athletics at Glebe Collegiate was constructed in 1958. LHS, which won the intermediate cross country race at Britannia in 1956, hosted 5000 at an interscholastic track meet in 1958. On May 30, 1959, the Ottawa Valley Invitational Track Meet held at R.D. Campbell Stadium attracted competitors from Deep River to Cornwall.

In 1958, LHS symphonic band came in second at the Ottawa Music Festival and participated in its first exchange visit to Knowlton, Quebec.

Student activities included student parliament, art, history, library, curling, radio, stamp & coin collecting. The Laurentian Arts Guild produced musicals with the assistance of the drama and musical club while art students furnished backdrops.

1960s–1970s increasing then decreasing enrollment
Laurentian's students came from two distinct areas: to the west, the middle-class neighbourhoods of Bel-Air Heights and Copeland Park, bounded by the Queensway, Woodroffe Ave, Baseline Rd and Clyde Ave; and to the north and east, the blue-collar and social housing neighbourhoods of Carlington: Caldwell, Morrisset, Trenton and surrounding streets. As the thousand-odd houses in the Bel-Air Park and Bel-Air Heights and Copeland Park neighbourhoods had been built by Robert Campeau within the space of about five years from approximately 1957 through 1962, the population of children at first steadily increased as the young couples bought houses and had children, then steadily declined as the initial home-buyers' children graduated.

LHS had its first Grade 13 class in 1961 out of an enrollment of 728. Marion B Daley, Miss Rough Riders 1960, was a student at LHS. The first 182 LHS graduates were advised during the first commencement exercises in November 1961 to "Get going, get hitched and get lost". Harry Pullen, speaker at the Commencement exercised recommended that graduates should get going and put to use the things they were taught in high school. They should get hitched to something which would make them strain to the utmost, something that would be challenging. He also advised the graduates to get lost in some cause and work for their fellow men.

In August 1962, the R.D. Campbell stadium hosted the finals of the Cantalla Trophy invitational knockout competition, which brought together soccer clubs from Ottawa, Montreal, Kingston and North Bay.

LHS engaged Mr. Henry Bonnenberg as music director. He had recently moved to Ottawa from the Netherlands, where he played with the Concertgebouw Orchestra. Within four years at Laurentian, he had developed an award-winning, symphonic band. It was classified a "symphonic band" because it used extensive woodwinds such as flutes, clarinets, oboes and bassoons to replicate the sound of violins and cellos. During the 1960s, sometimes known as the "Golden Age of popular music," Laurentian was filled with music and drama.  Memories of Vienna, one of the many concerts staged during this decade, was commended by Elisabeth Strauss, matriarch of the Strauss musical dynasty of Vienna. The Laurentian Symphonic Band travelled extensively to perform during the 1960s and 1970s, occasionally entertaining Canadian Servicemen in Europe. LHS toured Europe for 26 days in 1969 playing on Radio Nederlands and in the bandshell where the "Blue Danube" was first performed. LHS had the first high school band to perform in the Opera of the National Arts Centre. Following his retirement from LHS in 1979, Mr. Bonnenberg continued to teach music at the University of Ottawa until just before his death in 1995.

In October 1965 – The Junior Department of the Sunday School at Bethany Baptist Church moved to Laurentian High School which was across the road from the church building at that time.

During the late 1960s and early '70s the Ottawa School Board experimented at LHS with extended freedom for students, e.g., allowing optional attendance at class and exemption from exams if they maintained consistently high grades.

Mr. Stephen Glavin became Principal on June 8, 1970. In the mid-1970s, LHS had an enrollment of 1700 students while Nepean High School and Glebe Collegiate Institute were suffering declining enrollment. By 1984, 300 students from the LHS catchment zone were on loan to other schools. Mr. Ross, a former LHS teacher, served as principal in the mid-1980s.

In the 1990s Laurentian celebrated its multicultural diversity with potluck dinners. These events brought various cultures together, through their food. LHS had a wide array of clubs, organisations and groups. These included Junior and Senior Band, Reach for the Top, school newspaper, and the Laurentian Arts Guild.

Sports
LHS had many successful sports teams. Their cheerleading squad won awards. The men's and women's senior soccer teams, Nordic Ski, wrestling and Cross Country Running teams participated at OFSAA annually. Other athletic teams included Lions Football, Lions Rugby, Senior and Junior basketball, wrestling, track and field, field hockey, volleyball, golf, and regular intramural sports during lunch.

LHS supported a football and cheerleading program from 1958 to 1994. From 1958 to 1964, LHS Lions were coached by Joe Upton; LHS won the Junior C football title in 1958. From 1964 to 1994, LHS Lions coaches Ron Graham and Bob Wills won 10 Ottawa and Ottawa-Carleton league junior and senior titles. In 1965, for example, LHS Lions won the Senior Crown.

LHS supported a track and field program. Glenroy Gilbert and Ken Leblanc led LHS with Junior track and field records in the mid-1980s.

LHS supported a hockey program until the 1990s.

The LHS weight club had 50 members and 15 supervisors.

2000s: school closure
By 2004, the school closure question provoked protests. Student enrollment at Laurentian had fallen to 564, with a base population of 853, resulting in busing costs of $3848. LHS offered a full high school curriculum including 100+ basic, advanced and enriched courses and special technical options. With the rezoning of part of the Experimental Farm, thousands of homes were being built in the surrounding community of Central Park. On December 16, 2004, the Ottawa-Carleton District School Board decided to close both LHS and J. S. Woodsworth Secondary School due to declining enrollment. The final LHS students completed classes in June 2005, and the school was closed effective September 2005. The students who would have attended LHS, attended Merivale High School, Woodroffe High School, Nepean High School, Glebe Collegiate Institute or another school instead.
Following closure, the LHS building sat vacant for 3 years.

LHS 50th was celebrated in 2007 with a reunion of alumni.

Family Biz
The school served as the set of a television series, Family Biz, which began filming on May 5, 2008. A total of twenty-six 30-minute episodes were filmed. The series was co-produced by three organizations: Muse Entertainment (a Montreal film company), Summit Crescent Productions and Breakout Films. The series debuted in Spring of 2009 on YTV.

Swat
In July 2009 the school site was turned over the Ottawa's newly formed emergency response squad for disaster simulation manoeuvres, Tactical unit (SWAT).

Laurentian Place
LHS buildings and 15.5 acre property were offered for sale in 2007. The City of Ottawa was interested in keeping this community landmark in public hands, but the School Board was unwilling to compromise on the sale price. The Board subsequently sold the school on July 18, 2007, to $21.26 million to Clyde Baseline Developments Inc., a subsidiary of SmartCentres, a Toronto-based real-estate developer that specializes in big-box developments anchored by Wal-Mart stores. After community consultation and rezoning the LHS facilities were demolished in 2009. The brownfields were remediated including clean up of asbestos and heating oil spills in exchange for incentives of $1.8 million of property tax rebates. The property was converted to $60-million mixed-use development, known as Laurentian Place. The site features two- and three-storey buildings containing stores, offices, and a big-box Walmart superstore opened on the location in 2011.

Principals
Principals at LHS included:
 W.B. Wallen (from 1958)
 Howard A Barber (until 1970)
 Stephen Glavin (1970–1976)
 Ross Beck (1976-1986)
 G.J. Smith (1986-1988)
 J.R. King (1988-??)
 Katie Jarvis 1996-2001
? (2001-2005)

Fight song
Henry Bonnenberg, who concurrently served as director of music of the HMCS Carleton Band while teaching at LHS, composed the music for the fight song while Joe Upton, the physical education teacher composed the lyrics:

References

External links

Laurentian High Photos
Laurentian High Sold to development Giant Clyde Baseline Developments a subsidiaty of Smartcentres 2007
Development Proposal for Laurentian Place Mixed use Development
 Good bye Laurentian High by Ron Ferguson, YouTube video

Defunct schools in Ottawa
Educational institutions established in 1958
Educational institutions disestablished in 2005
1958 establishments in Ontario
2005 disestablishments in Ontario
Buildings and structures demolished in 2009
Demolished buildings and structures in Ontario